Péter Balázs is a Hungarian sprint canoeist who has competed since 2006. He won three medals at the ICF Canoe Sprint World Championships with two golds (C-4 200 m: 2007, C-4 500 m: 2007) and one bronze (C-4 200 m: 2006).

References

Hungarian male canoeists
Living people
Year of birth missing (living people)
ICF Canoe Sprint World Championships medalists in Canadian
21st-century Hungarian people